Jonathan Sagall (born April 23, 1959) is a Canadian-born Israeli actor, director, producer and screenwriter.

Early life
Sagall was born to a Jewish family in Toronto, Ontario, Canada. Several members of his family were survivors of the Holocaust, who then immigrated from Poland to Israel after World War II, then to Canada. Sagall immigrated to Israel from Canada with his family at age 3. During the rest of his childhood, Sagall grew up in Haifa, Israel, and eventually graduated from the Hebrew Reali School in this city. His mother, Ruth Sagall, was an actress at the Haifa Theatre.

Career

At a young age, Sagall did stagework for local Israeli theaters. His first appearance as an actor occurred in a 1977 Israeli television film which did not gain much attention. Sagall gained much success after he played Momo in the successful 1978 Israeli film Lemon Popsicle (Eskimo Limon) which became an Israeli cult film, and reprised the role in 6 of the 7 sequels: Going Steady (1979), Hot Bubblegum (1981), Private Popsicle (1982), Baby Love (1984), Young Love (1987) and Summertime Blues (1988).

In 1979, Sagall was an actor in the New Media Bible Series as Joseph.

In 1983 Sagall played the lead role in the drama Drifting directed by Amos Guttman, where he played a lonely young homosexual man who attempts to find love and break into the movie business. During the mid-1980s, Sagall began producing and directing short films.

He appeared opposite Diane Keaton in the 1984 George Roy Hill film The Little Drummer Girl. In 1992 Sagall was cast in the role of Poldek Pfefferberg, in the film Schindler's List which was produced and directed by Steven Spielberg.

As a screenwriter and film director Sagall created and directed the 1998 drama film Link City (קשר עיר), in which he also played a supporting role. Among the other films he created - The Jewish State and blood.

His 1999 film Urban Feel was entered into the 49th Berlin International Film Festival.

In 2007 Sagall participated in the TV series HaMakom (The Place) in Channel 10.

His 2011 film Lipstikka premiered at the 61st Berlin International Film Festival and was nominated for the Golden Bear.

Filmography

References

External links
 
 

1959 births
Living people
Male actors from Toronto
Male actors from Haifa
Hebrew Reali School alumni
20th-century Israeli Jews
21st-century Israeli Jews
Jewish Israeli male actors
Canadian emigrants to Israel
Israeli people of Polish-Jewish descent
Israeli male film actors
Israeli male stage actors
Israeli male television actors
Israeli film directors
Israeli film producers
Israeli television directors
Israeli male screenwriters
20th-century Israeli male actors
21st-century Israeli male actors
20th-century Israeli screenwriters
21st-century Israeli screenwriters
Israeli gay actors
Israeli gay writers
Israeli LGBT screenwriters
Gay Jews
Gay screenwriters
LGBT film producers
LGBT film directors
LGBT television directors
20th-century Israeli LGBT people
21st-century Israeli LGBT people